Karaginsky Gulf is a large gulf in the Bering Sea off the northeastern coast of Kamchatka (Russia), which cuts  deep inland. The largest island in the gulf is the Karaginsky Island, separated from the mainland by the Litke Strait. The Karaginsky Gulf is covered with ice from December until June.

External links
 Satellite image from Google

Gulfs of Russia
Gulfs of the Pacific Ocean
Bays of the Bering Sea
Bodies of water of the Kamchatka Peninsula
Pacific Coast of Russia